A religious symbol is an iconic representation intended to represent a specific religion, or a specific concept within a given religion.
 
Religious symbols have been used in the military in many countries, such as the United States military chaplain symbols. Similarly, the United States Department of Veterans Affairs emblems for headstones and markers recognize 57 symbols (including a number of symbols expressing non-religiosity).

Symbols representing a specific religion

Symbolic representation of a specific religious tradition is useful in a society with religious pluralism, as was the case in the Roman Empire, and again in modern multiculturalism.

Religious symbolism

African Indigenous religions

In some African Indigenous religions, there are graphical and pictorial symbols representing the actual religion or faith just like the Abrahamic faith. Each indigenous religion however, has symbolisms which are religious or spiritual in nature. Some of these may be graphical, numerological (as in Serer numerology - see Serer creation myth) or a  combination of both. However, these graphical images represent the actual religion practice and elements within the faith. 
The Ìṣẹ̀ṣe religion of the yoruba people indigenous religion as an example has it graphical and pictorial symbol representing the religion, the symbol explained the philosophical concept of the four cardinal point of the earth.

The very nature of African art stem from "their themes of symbolism, functionalism and utilitarianism" hence why African art is multi-functional. In the African Indigenous belief system, Africans draw from their various artistic traditions as sources of inspiration.

Other examples of religious symbolism
Ayyavazhi symbolism
Buddhist symbolism
Christian symbolism
Jewish symbolism
Symbolism in The Church of Jesus Christ of Latter-day Saints

See also

Allegory
Religious and political symbols in Unicode
Baháʼí symbols
French law on secularity and conspicuous religious symbols in schools
Religion in national symbols
Sigil
Symbols of Islam
Religious symbolism in the United States military

References

Bibliography

External links

Religious symbols and their meanings
United States Veteran's Administration approved religious symbols for graves

Religious